Valeri Mas i Casas (Sant Martí de Provençals, 22 May 1894 - Lissac-sur-Couze, 19 July 1973) was a Catalan anarcho-syndicalist.

Biography
Valeri Mas i Casas was born in the Sant Martí de Provençals neighborhood of Barcelona on 22 May 1894, the son of Joan Mas and Maria Casas. When he was 14 years old he joined a textile workers union and later affiliated with the National Confederation of Labor.

During the first months of the Spanish Civil War, Valeri acted as a representative of the CNT in the Supplies Committee. In November 1936 he replaced María Rodriguez Vázquez in the secretariat of the CNT's Catalan regional committee, a position he held until May 1937. He later joined the Generalitat de Catalunya, acting as Minister of Economy, Public Services, Health and Social Assistance from 5 May to 28 June 1937. In March 1939 he fled to Perpignan and took part in the creation of the Spanish Libertarian Movement.

He died in his home, in Lissac-sur-Couze, on 19 July 1973.

References

1894 births
1973 deaths
Anarchists from Catalonia
Economy ministers of Catalonia
Health ministers of Catalonia